Ode to Gallantry is a Hong Kong television series adapted from Louis Cha's novel Ode to Gallantry. The series was first broadcast on TVB in Hong Kong in 1989.

Cast
 Note: Some of the characters' names are in Cantonese romanisation.

 Tony Leung as Shek Po-tin / Shek Chung-yuk
 Sheren Tang as Ting Tong
 Yiu Cheng-ching as Ngai Tung-yee
 Lau Suk-wah as Tit San-wu
 Cheng Yin-lai as Si Kim
 Cheung Yick as Pui Hoi-shek
 Lam Chung as Tse Yin-hak
 Yu Ka-lun as Muk-yung Pak
 Chu Tit-wo as Shek Ching
 Sheung-koon Yuk as Man Yau
 Chan Ka-pik as Ah-sau
 Kwan Hoi-san as Pak Tsi-tsoi
 Chun Wong as Ting Pat-sam
 Yip Tin-hang as Tin-mo
 Leung Oi as Ngai Por-por
 Choi Wan as Peach Valley master
 Mak Tin-yan as Pak Man-kim
 Bobby Au-yeung as Cheung Siu
 Chan Wing-chun as Lei Yiu
 Cheung Ying-choi as Island master Lung
 Suen Kwai-hing as Miu Tai

See also
Ode to Gallantry (film)
Ode to Gallantry (1985 TV series)
Ode to Gallantry (2002 TV series)

External links

Works based on Ode to Gallantry
Hong Kong wuxia television series
TVB dramas
1989 Hong Kong television series debuts
1989 Hong Kong television series endings
Cantonese-language television shows
Television shows based on works by Jin Yong